According to the discography in The Authorized Roy Orbison, Roy Orbison at the Rock House is the 1st album by Orbison on the Sun Records label in 1961 (Orbison's second LP release), at a time when Orbison had already moved to the Monument label. Sun Records owner Sam Phillips had a collection of songs Orbison had recorded at Sun between 1956 and '58. Phillips capitalized on the national recognition Orbison had achieved at Monument through three major hit singles in 1960 and '61 that had gone to the top of the Billboard charts.

Most of the songs on Roy Orbison at the Rock House were written by Orbison but the songwriting credits were assigned to Sam Phillips, and are in the traditional rockabilly style the Sun label was known for. Notable exceptions are compositions by other Sun artists Harold Jenkins (better known as "Conway Twitty") and Johnny Cash. "Rock House" is credited to Orbison and Jenkins.

For this release, all tracks except "Devil Doll" have been overdubbed with background vocals and/or additional instruments.

Track listing
This album was only released in US.

Personnel
The Teen Kings 
Roy Orbison - lead vocals, lead guitar
James Morrow - electric mandolin
Jack Kennelley - double bass
Johnny Wilson - acoustic guitar
Billy Pat Ellis - drums

Additional Musicians
The Four Roses - backing vocals
unknown - guitar, bass, piano, drums; overdubbed guitars, bass, piano, drums, backing vocals

References

Roy Orbison albums
1961 debut albums
Albums produced by Sam Phillips
Sun Records albums
Albums recorded at Sun Studio